Stade Georges Lambrakis is a multi-use stadium in Le Port, Réunion.  It is currently used mostly for football matches and serves as the home stadium for SS Jeanne d'Arc. The stadium holds 2,000 people.

References 

Football venues in Réunion